Babna Gora may refer to several places in Slovenia: 

Babna Gora, Dobrova–Polhov Gradec, a settlement in the Municipality of Dobrova–Polhov Gradec
Babna Gora, Šmarje pri Jelšah, a settlement in the Municipality of Šmarje pri Jelšah
Babna Gora, Trebnje, a settlement in the Municipality of Trebnje